
Gmina Lipiany is an urban-rural gmina (administrative district) in Pyrzyce County, West Pomeranian Voivodeship, in north-western Poland.

Villages
Apart from the town of Lipiany, Gmina Lipiany contains the villages and settlements of Batowo, Będzin, Brzostowo, Czajczyn, Dębiec, Derczewko, Dołżyn, Dzieżno, Głębokie, Jarzębnik, Jedlice, Józefin, Krasne, Łasiczyn, Łosiniec, Małcz, Miedzyn, Mielęcinek, Mielnik, Mierzawy, Mironów, Mokronos, Nowice, Osetna, Piaśnik, Połczyno, Przywodzie, Skrzynka, Sokolniki, Sulino, Świerszczyki, Wądół, Wielice, Wojnowice, Wołczyn and Żarnowo.

Neighbouring gminas
Gmina Lipiany is bordered by the gminas of Barlinek, Myślibórz, Przelewice and Pyrzyce.

References
Polish official population figures 2006

Lipiany
Pyrzyce County